Saint Peter's is the ancient parish church of Harborne, Birmingham, England.

Background

There has been a church on the site since Saxon times and St Chad is even thought to have preached there. The base of an early preaching cross was found in the mid-1980s during work at the back of the church. The parish formerly covered what is now Smethwick (North Harborne), all of current Harborne and even parts of Quinton (Ridgeacre).

The present building is Victorian, dating from the 1860s by architect Yeoville Thomason. Elihu Burritt, who was living in Harborne at the time was on the committee that oversaw the restoration. The tower is far older and is all that remains of the medieval church. It is believed to date from the 14th century. The sanctuary was rebuilt during 1974/5 after a fire.
It is a Grade II listed building.

Burials

 Bob Brettle, boxer
 David Cox, watercolourist - there is also a sanctuary memorial window to him.
 Thomas Baker, watercolourist. He is buried next to David Cox.
 Anne Chamberlain, wife of Neville Chamberlain, Prime Minister.
 Sir Charles Haughton Rafter  , Chief Constable of Birmingham City Police between 1899 and 1935.
 George Edward Hunt, jeweller

There are also 40 war graves of Commonwealth service personnel, 22 from World War I and 18 from World War II.

List of Vicars

Curate = W. Harding (November 1826 – March 1827)
Rev Thomas Smith 1858-?
The Ven. Ralph Creed Meredith 1919–1920
Canon Richardson
Ven. Sidney Harvie-Clarke, Archdeacon of Birmingham
Angus Greer McIntyre 1971
Michael Counsell 1976–1989
C.J. Evans (Fr.Jo) 1992–2008
C.S. Ralph 2010–2013
Graeme Richardson 2014 – September 2019
Rev Can Kate Stowe 2020 - Present

Bells

The bells were purchased from the church of Bishop Ryder in Deritend and installed by John Taylor & Co. The ring of eight was dedicated on 2 March 1963. The tenor bell weighs nearly 13 cwt and the ring is in F#.

Organ

The organ dates from 1975, replacing a previous instrument destroyed in a fire. The organ specification was designed by George Miles, the church organist, and can be found on the National Pipe Organ Register.

List of organists
Roland Mellor Winn 1874 - 1904
Franklyn Mountford 1904 - 1927 (formerly organist at St James’ Church, Handsworth and St. John's Church, Truro)
W.E. Robinson
George Miles 1946 - 1988
Ian Ledsham 1993 - 2000
Victoria Gravenor 2001 - 2004
David Friel 2005–present

References

Church of England church buildings in Birmingham, West Midlands
Grade II listed buildings in Birmingham
Grade II listed churches in the West Midlands (county)
Harborne